USS Jarvis (DD-799) was a  destroyer of the United States Navy, the third Navy ship named for Midshipman James C. Jarvis (1787–1800), who was killed at the age of 13 during the historic engagement between the famed frigate  and the French frigate La Vengeance.

Jarvis was laid down by the Seattle-Tacoma Shipbuilding Corp., Seattle, Washington; 7 June 1943; launched 14 February 1944; sponsored by Mrs. Harold Burkit, daughter of  Rufus C. Holman, U.S. Senator from Oregon; and commissioned 3 June 1944.

Service history

World War II 

After shakedown off the California coast, Jarvis departed Seattle 25 August for Pearl Harbor as escort for the battleship . Arriving 31 August, she proceeded independently 3 September to Adak, Alaska, to join the North Pacific Force, engaged in operations against the Kurile Islands. Operating out of Adak and Attu, Jarvis battled stormy seas and prolonged bad weather to conduct eight raids on shipping and shore installations from Paramushiru to Matsuwa. After returning to Adak 15 August 1945 from her last raid, she steamed to Aomori, Honshū, to support occupation operations. Arriving Aomori 8 September, she plied the Sea of Japan, assisting occupation landings and destroying military installations on Honshū and Hokkaidō. Jarvis departed Yokosuka, Honshū, 19 November for the United States. Arriving Pearl Harbor 29 November, she joined the "Magic Carpet" fleet and sailed 1 December for the East Coast via San Diego and the Panama Canal, returning veterans of the Pacific War. She reached Charleston, South Carolina, 22 December; deactivated as a unit of the Atlantic Reserve Fleet 11 April 1946; and decommissioned 29 June.

1951 – 1960 

With the development and enlargement of the Korean War, Jarvis recommissioned 8 February 1951. She operated in the Atlantic out of Charleston and Norfolk, Va. for more than a year before departing Norfolk 15 May 1952 for deployment to Korea. Steaming via Panama, the West Coast, and Japan, she arrived off Korea's eastern coast 23 June and began blockade and interdiction patrols. Under her skipper, Comdr. C. D. McCall, she ranged the coast from Songjin to Chongjin, conducting operations with the 7th Fleet until returning to Yokosuka, Japan, 18 August. Following operations in Japanese waters, she joined the Formosa Patrol from 26 September to 10 October. After completing this important duty, she proceeded to the Philippine Islands; and on the 18th she departed Subic Bay for the United States via Ceylon, Suez, and Gibraltar, arriving Norfolk 12 December.

Jarvis resumed operations with the Atlantic Fleet and on 4 May 1954 deployed to the Mediterranean, arriving Naples, Italy, 18 May. Before returning to Norfolk 9 July, she operated with the mighty 6th Fleet, America's deterrent to Communist aggression in the Middle East.

Clearing Norfolk 5 January 1955, Jarvis sailed to the West Coast, arriving Long Beach 26 January. After training off the California Coast, she departed 21 April on the first of five post-Korean War deployments to the Far East. As a unit of the powerful and versatile 7th Fleet, she ranged the Western Pacific from Japan to the Philippines, ever alert to insure peace in the unsettled Far East. While on her 1955 deployment to the Far East, she supported the evacuation of thousands of refugees from North to South Vietnam during Operation Passage to Freedom. During all her deployments she conducted patrols in the Formosa Strait to help stabilize the Nationalist-Communist struggle and prevent the invasion of Formosa from the mainland. In 1958 she provided valuable assistance for the Chinese Nationalists during the threatened Communist invasion of Quemoy and Matsu.

Jarvis returned to Long Beach from her fifth deployment 4 March 1960 and resumed coastal operations until 24 September when she sailed for the East Coast. Arriving Philadelphia 16 October, Jarvis decommissioned 24 October and entered the Atlantic Reserve Fleet.

Alcalá Galiano 

On 3 November 1960 the ship was turned over to Spain on a 5-year renewable loan under terms of the Military Assistance Program. She served the Spanish Navy as  Alcalá Galiano, at first with hull number 44, then designated D 24.

Alcalá Galiano was stricken 15 December 1988 and broken up for scrap.

Awards 
Jarvis received one battle star for World War II service and one battle star for Korean War service.

References

External links 
   navsource.org: USS Jarvis
 hazegray.org: USS Jarvis

 

Fletcher-class destroyers of the United States Navy
Ships built in Seattle
1944 ships
World War II destroyers of the United States
Cold War destroyers of the United States
Korean War destroyers of the United States
Fletcher-class destroyers of the Spanish Navy